Kpopmap is a South Korean content publisher which covers Korean popular music and dramas.

Overview
Kpopmap is known for interviews, virtual vote casting, and competition tracking. Their work has been used by publishers in Indonesia, Malaysia, Vietnam, and South Korea.

Additionally, they are also known for holding event such as Alohao.

References

South Korean websites